Una vita is the first novel of Italo Svevo, the author of the seminal modernist novel, Zeno's Conscience.  Originally titled Un inetto – inetto may be translated as 'inept,' unfit', 'unsuitable' or 'incapable' – this name was rejected by the publisher, who requested that it be changed to Una vita – 'A Life' – which is also the name of a famous Maupassant novel.  The first draft was submitted in 1888.  It was refused by the publishing house Treves, and wasn't published until 1892 by Vram, at the expense of Svevo himself.
The original title, Un inetto, was perhaps intended to illustrate the psychology of the main character and, in a certain sense, the pessimism typical of the author.

Plot 

Alfonso Nitti, a shy young intellectual with literary aspirations, leaves his home in the country where his mother lives to go to Trieste - though the city is not named - and work in a white collar job, as a copy clerk in Maller's bank.
One day, he is invited to the house of his boss and of his daughter Annetta who knows Macario, a young man with whom Alfonso is friends. Annetta, like Alfonso, is interested in literature, and holds a weekly soiree to which several suitors are invited. Alfonso joins this, and he and Annetta begin to co-author a novel. Alfonso accepts this project out of self-interest, having no respect for Annetta's literary abilities, but ingratiatingly allows her to control the project so that they can be together in the hope of winning her hand. He soon convinces himself that he loves her, but realises that at the same time he despises her. Eventually he seduces Annetta but then, on the verge of marrying her, he flees on the advice of Francesca, her father's mistress, who warns him that the marriage would be a failure. She predicts that while he is away Annetta will forget him and marry a rival. By chance, while he is away, he is delayed by the prolonged illness of his dying mother, and Francesca's prediction proves correct. Meanwhile Annetta has confessed to her father that Alfonso compromised her and, although Alfonso is relieved at not having to keep his promise to Annetta, on his return to the bank he is treated with hostility by his employer. He decides to live a life of contemplation, away from passions.  But after discovering that Annetta is engaged to his acquaintance Macario, whom he dislikes, he nevertheless feels jealous. He makes a last-ditch bid to speak to Annetta but is rejected. He attempts to assuage his conscience by giving a dowry to his landlady's daughter so that she can marry respectably but, following a demotion at the bank, he accidentally insults Frederico, Annetta's brother, and is obliged to accept a duel. Before this can take place, he decides to kill himself, with feelings of calm and relief at ending his maladjusted existence.

References 
Svevo, Italo.  Una Vita.  Classici Moderni Oscar Mondadori, 1985, Milan

20th-century Italian novels
Novels set in Trieste
Novels by Italo Svevo
Modernist novels
1892 novels